Hendrik Doijer Jzn (born 14 September 1830 – 13 April 1906) was a Dutch politician, who first made a career in the administration on the Dutch Gold Coast and who became interim governor during the European leave of governor Henri Alexander Elias on 13 June 1864, upon the death of his interim predecessor Carel van Hien. He later became mayor of Zoeterwoude and Woerden.

Biography 
Doijer was born in Amsterdam to painter Jacobus Schoemaker Doyer and Petronella Evekink.

Hendrik Doijer established himself as a merchant on the Gold Coast in 1851, joining his brother Huibert, who had been an agent for H. van Rijckevorsel & Co. since 1849. In 1853, Hendrik and Huibert founded the company Doijer Brothers in Elmina. Unlike his brother Huibert, who always remained a private merchant, Hendrik joined the Dutch colonial administration in 1856.

Notes

References 
 

1830 births
1906 deaths
Colonial governors of the Dutch Gold Coast